During the season  1966-67 Football Club Internazionale Milano competed in Serie A, Coppa Italia and European Cup.

Summary 

After the last season local championship, the club nerazzurro tried the transfers of 21-yrs-old German midfielder Franz Beckenbauer from Bayern München and Portuguese striker Eusébio from Benfica both players with a remarkable tournament in England that summer. However, Italian Federation of Football banned the arrivals of foreign players — due to the flop of National Italian Team at 1966 FIFA World Cup defeated by Asian newcomers North Korea — resulting in a 14 years measure lifted up until 1980. So, the club changes its plans and signed new player : Brazilian Luís Vinício replacing Spanish Peiró, transferred out to Roma.A debut of young player Dehò, disputing only one match .

With advisor manager Allodi, President Angelo Moratti tried to transfer Riva in from Cagliari: manager Herrera approved the transfer, Rombo di Tuono with a loan to Bologna in exchange of Pascutti. Although, club official Schiavio opposed to the accord with a dimition on the table presented.

The campaign is remembered as the end of the Grande Inter era, in league the squad finished the competition with six games where could not reach a single victory (included 3 of them at home) paved the way to Juventus to clinch the title by a mere point surpassing Inter on the final day of the league season. In European Cup the team advance to the Final match with right winger Jair da Costa gone and Luis Suárez injured, and finally lost the European Cup 2–1 to Celtic Glasgow.

During the season the club changes its denomination Football Club Internazionale to Football Club Internazionale Milano.

Squad

Transfers

Competitions

Serie A

League table

Results by round

Matches

Coppa Italia

Quarterfinals

Semifinals

European Cup

Round of 32

Eightfinals

Quarterfinals

Semifinals

Final

Statistics

Squad statistics

Players statistics

See also 
 History of La Grande Inter

References

Bibliography

External links 

Inter Milan seasons
Inter Milan